Reinhold "Roy" Henkel (August 22, 1905 in Briesen, German Empire – October 6, 1981) was a Canadian ice hockey player who competed in the 1932 Winter Olympics.

In 1932 Henkel was a member of the Winnipeg Hockey Club which won the World Championships and Olympic gold medal for Canada. He played all six matches and scored two goals.

Notes

External links
Roy Henkel's profile at databaseOlympics
Roy Henkel's profile at the Canadian Olympic Committee
Roy Henkel's profile at Sports Reference.com

1905 births
1981 deaths
People from Wąbrzeźno
People from West Prussia
Sportspeople from Kuyavian-Pomeranian Voivodeship
German emigrants to Canada
Canadian ice hockey defencemen
Ice hockey players at the 1932 Winter Olympics
Olympic gold medalists for Canada
Olympic ice hockey players of Canada
Olympic medalists in ice hockey
Winnipeg Hockey Club players
Medalists at the 1932 Winter Olympics